Nyle may refer to:

Nyle (given name)
New York and Lake Erie Railroad, (reporting mark NYLE)

See also
Nyl River
Nyl (disambiguation)
Nile (disambiguation)